The Second Soviet Antarctic Expedition was led by Aleksei Treshnikov on the continent; the marine expedition on the "Ob" was led by I. V. Maksimov. The "Ob" left Kaliningrad on 7 November, 1956.

Three ships were used to transport the expedition, all diesel-electric. The two main ships were as for the first expedition: RV Ob (flagship; captain )) and RV "Lena" (captain A. I. Vetrov). The third ship was Kooperatsiya (captain A. S. Yantselevich), used mainly as a transport vessel.

The tasks of the expedition were:

 Relief of the first expedition
 Full scale scientific work for the International Geophysical Year (IGY) This included glacier mapping and wildlife tracking, among other things.
 Organisation of two IGY scientific stations near the south geomagnetic pole and pole of relative inaccessibility
 An inland tractor-sledge traverse for glaciology
 Oceanography

List of features named by the expedition
 Lena Passage, named after the ship Lena
 Lednikov Bay (Bukhta Lednikovaya), named for location

References 
 A V Nudel Man Soviet Antarctic Expeditions 1955–1959, Izdatel'stvo Akademii Nauk SSSR, Moskva, 1959 (translated from the Russian by the Israel program for scientific translations, Jerusalem, 1966 for the National Science Foundation).

 02
Antarctic Expedition 02
Antarctic Expedition 02
Antarctic Expedition 02
1956 in Antarctica
1957 in Antarctica
1958 in Antarctica